Nagykőrös is a town in Pest County, Hungary.

János Arany taught there from about 1851, and a local museum is named for him.

Notable people
Szabolcs Czira (b. 1951), politician
Frigyes Hegedűs (1920–2008), pentathlete 
István Kecskés (b. 1980), boxer
Mór Réthy (1846–1925), mathematician
János Zatykó (b. 1948), agrarian engineer and politician

Twin towns — sister cities

Nagykőrös is twinned with:
 Castrocaro Terme e Terra del Sole, Italy
 Espelkamp, Germany 
 Haaksbergen, Netherlands
 Reghin, Romania
 Salonta, Romania

References

External links

 in Hungarian
Street map 

Populated places in Pest County